Connie Marie Conway (born September 25, 1950) is an American politician who served as the U.S. representative for  from 2022 to 2023. She served as a member of the California State Assembly from 2008 to 2014. Before that, Conway was a member of the board of supervisors for Tulare County from 2001 until 2008. She is a member of the Republican Party.

Early life and career 
Conway was born in Bakersfield, California. She attended the College of the Sequoias and California State University, Fresno. Her father, John Conway, served on the Tulare County Board of Supervisors from 1981 until his death in 1991.

From 1988 to 1991, Conway worked as a wellness coordinator at the Kaweah Delta Medical Center. From 1991 to 1994, she worked at Sweet's Home Medical. From 1994 to 2000, Conway worked as a district manager at CorVel Corporation.

Tulare County Board of Supervisors
Conway served on the Tulare County Board of Supervisors for eight years. She also chaired the board in 2005 and 2008. Conway also chaired the California Partnership for the San Joaquin Valley, an appointment she received from the governor. The partnership works to improve the economy and quality of life in the San Joaquin Valley by making policy recommendations to the governor. In 2006, Conway served as president of the California State Association of Counties, which represents California's 58 counties at the state and federal levels. She later became a director of the National Association of Counties, chaired its membership committee, and worked on its economic development committee.

California State Assembly 
Conway entered the 2008 election to succeed termed-out Bill Maze in the California State Assembly. In the primary, she faced two candidates, Rebecca Maze (the incumbent's wife) and Bob Smith, a retired sheriff's deputy, and won.

After her reelection to the Assembly on November 2, 2010, Conway was elected by her Republican colleagues as the Assembly Republican Leader after a closed-door meeting of Assembly Republicans on November 4. She said that outgoing Minority Leader Martin Garrick had voluntarily stepped down and she had been elected unanimously. Conway was the first woman to serve as GOP assembly leader since 1981.

U.S. House of Representatives

Elections

2022 special 

Conway was a candidate in the 2022 special election in California's 22nd congressional district to replace Devin Nunes, who stepped down in January 2022. In the April nonpartisan blanket primary, she advanced to a runoff against Democrat Lourin Hubbard. On June 7, 2022, Conway defeated Hubbard in the runoff election.

Tenure
Conway was sworn in on June 14. On July 19, 2022, Conway voted against the Respect for Marriage Act, which would protect the right to same-sex marriage at a federal level. On August 12, 2022, Conway voted against the Inflation Reduction Act.

Conway did not run for reelection in November 2022.

Committee assignments 

 Committee on Natural Resources
 Subcommittee on Energy and Mineral Resources
 Subcommittee on Water, Oceans, and Wildlife
 Committee on Veterans' Affairs
 Subcommittee on Disability Assistance and Memorial Affairs
Source:

References

External links

|-

  
|-

|-

|-

1950 births
21st-century American politicians
21st-century American women politicians
California State University, Fresno alumni
College of the Sequoias alumni
County supervisors in California
Female members of the United States House of Representatives
Living people
People from Tulare, California
Politicians from Bakersfield, California
Republican Party members of the California State Assembly
Republican Party members of the United States House of Representatives from California
Women state legislators in California